Cal Islet (also: Ilhéu de Baixo) is a small island about  south of Porto Santo Island, in the Madeira Archipelago, Portugal. The islet has never been inhabited.

History

Cal Islet houses an important testimony to the history and culture of Porto Santo. It was once mined for lime (cal in Portuguese). Its extraction led to several accidents, one of which killed sixteen workers, victims of a mine collapse. The mines are no longer active, but remnants are still intact and can be visited with a proper license and specialized escort.

The construction of a cable car was planned to connect the tip of Calheta (in Porto Santo) to the islet. The project was abandoned because the large numbers of visitors would have endangered the regeneration of the islet's fragile ecosystem.

Ecological Preservation

Despite of its rough appearance, this islet is home to a very rich flora, which includes the usual coastal shrubs and some traces of laurisilva, probably due to its difficult access. It is also a breeding ground for at least four species of birds, the Atlantic canary, the Berthelot's pipit, the plain swift and the little shearwater and home to endemic land snails, Amphorella cimensis and Leiostyla relevata. For these reasons, its ecosystem is protected by the Portuguese PDM and Rede Natura 2000.

References

External links
Olhares.aeiou.pt: photo of Cal Islet—Ilhéu da Cal

Porto Santo Island
Cal Islet
Cal Islet